Saint-Valery-en-Caux (literally Saint-Valery in Caux) is a commune in the Seine-Maritime department in the Normandy region in northern France.

The addition of an acute accent on the "e" (Valéry) is incorrect.

Geography
Here, huge chalk cliffs rise up from the pebble beach (sandy at low tide) to overlook the English Channel. The SNCF station closed in the 1990s and the only public transport available is an infrequent bus service.

History
It is said to have been founded by Saint Valery in the 7th century. A monastery was built on the site of the present-day town and was known as ‘’’Sanctum Walaricum’’’ in 990 CE, according to the charter in which Richard I, Duke of Normandy, gave the town (part of his personal property) to the abbey of Fecamp.
A busy fishing port from the 13th to the 17th century, its decline was due to the growth of the much larger port of Fecamp, to the west.

It is perhaps best known as the place where the British 51st (Highland) Infantry Division commanded by Major-General Victor Fortune and French troops surrendered to Major-General Erwin Rommel on 12 June 1940, with the town partly destroyed in the fighting. Saint-Valéry-en-Caux was liberated on 11 September 1944 by a re-formed 51st Highland division, among scenes of great local jubilation. On 17 January 1945, the railway station was destroyed when a runaway train full of American troops crashed into it. 89 American soldiers were killed and 152 were injured.
The town has a casino, a waterpark and has achieved the highest rating of four flowers in the annual France in Bloom competition. Tourism now accounts for much of the town's prosperity.

Heraldry

Population

Places of interest
 The church of St. Valery, dating from the fifteenth century.
A Norman-style half-timber house .
 The Commonwealth War Graves Commission cemetery.
 A seventeenth-century cloister from the old convent.
 The lighthouse.
 The memorial to the 51st Highland Division, on the cliff tops.

People 
 French artist Adrien Victor Auger (1787–1854), was born here in October 1787.
 Orientalist Charles Defrémery (1822–1883) died in Saint-Valery-en-Caux.
 Chelsea Football Club footballer Demba Ba grew up here.

Twin towns
  Inverness, Scotland
  Sontheim, Germany

See also
Communes of the Seine-Maritime department

References

External links

 Official website of Saint-Valéry-en-Caux  
 Unofficial Website of the commune 
 The City of Inverness - twinning with St Valéry
 Website of Aeroclub Cauchois (LFOS) Discover Normandy from the air 
 The CWGC cemetery
 History of the shipowner's house 'Henry IV house' including surprising links with Cannibals and South America!

Communes of Seine-Maritime
Seaside resorts in France